Welsh is a surname from the Old English language given to the Celtic Britons. The surname can also be the result of anglicization of the German cognate Welsch. A popular surname in Scotland.

Etymology
These terms were used by many ancient Germanic peoples to describe inhabitants of the former Roman Empire over the Alps, Rhine, and North Sea, who spoke Latin or Celtic languages. The Old High German walh became walch in Middle High German and the adjectival walhisk became MHG welsch. In present-day German, Welsche refers to Romance peoples, the Italians in particular, but also the French and the Romanic neighbours of the German-speaking lands in general.

The Old English variant wilisc of the Proto-Germanic root was applied to the native British peoples encountered by the Saxon invaders and settlers during the 5th and 6th centuries AD. Over the succeeding centuries the term wilisc morphed through Middle English into Welsh, becoming an epithet at once more specifically for the Welsh people, as England became increasingly populated with Anglo-Saxons.

Notable people
 Barry Welsh, comedy character played by John Sparkes
 Chris Welsh, former baseball pitcher and current announcer for the Cincinnati Reds
 Christie Welsh, American soccer player
 David Welsh, Scottish religious leader
 Freddie Welsh, Welsh World Lightweight boxing champion
 George Welsh (disambiguation), several people
 Irvine Welsh, Scottish author
 John Welsh (English footballer), player for Hull City, England
 Kenneth Welsh (1942–2022), Canadian film and television actor
 Mark Welsh, 20th Chief of Staff of the United States Air Force
 Matt Welsh, Australian swimmer
 Matthew E. Welsh, American politician and governor of Indiana
 Patrick Welsh (disambiguation), several people
 Peter Welsh (disambiguation), several people
 Paul Welsh, British television and radio correspondent
 Sean Welsh, Scottish footballer
 Thomas Welsh (basketball), American basketball player
 William Welsh (footballer), British footballer

See also
 Walsh (surname)
 Welch (surname)
 Walshe (surname)
 Welsch
 Welsche
 Walch
 Walsch
 Walhaz

External links
 Welsh surname DNA Project

English-language surnames
Surnames of Old English origin
Surnames of Irish origin
Americanized surnames
English toponymic surnames